Naganakulam is a village situated north east to Madurai city, Tamil Nadu, India along New Natham Road. Tamil Nadu Tourism Development Corporation (TTDC) inaugurated a mechanised boat service in the Naganakulam lake to provide entertainment and recreation facilities for Madurai residents and tourists.
Naganakulam belongs to madurai corporation
Has a population of about 300 family's according to census taken on 2017.

References

Villages in Madurai district